Thorpe is former coal town located in McDowell County, West Virginia, United States. Thorpe was an independent community and was incorporated into Gary, West Virginia in 1971. Thorpe has its own post office.

References

Populated places in McDowell County, West Virginia
Coal towns in West Virginia
Neighborhoods in West Virginia